The Late Period of ancient Egypt refers to the last flowering of native Egyptian rulers after the Third Intermediate Period in the 26th Saite Dynasty founded by Psamtik I, but includes the time of Achaemenid Persian rule over Egypt after the conquest by Cambyses II in 525 BC as well. The Late Period existed from 664 BC until 332 BC, following a period of foreign rule by the Nubian 25th Dynasty and beginning with a short period of Neo-Assyrian suzerainty, with Psamtik I initially ruling as their vassal. The period ended with the conquests of the Persian Empire by Alexander the Great and establishment of the Ptolemaic dynasty by his general Ptolemy I Soter, one of the Hellenistic diadochi from Macedon in northern Greece. With the Macedonian Greek conquest in the latter half of the 4th century BC, the age of Hellenistic Egypt began.

History

26th Dynasty

The Twenty-Sixth Dynasty, also known as the Saite Dynasty after its seat of power the city of Sais, reigned from 672 to 525 BC, and consisted of six pharaohs. It started with the unification of Egypt under Psamtik I c. 656 BC, itself a direct consequence of the Sack of Thebes by the Assyrians in 663 BC. Canal construction from the Nile to the Red Sea began.

Egypt seems to have expanded into the Near East early in this period. A wide range of archaeological finds from the Levant shows an Egyptian occupation and control in the late decades of the 7th century BC. These include various Egyptian objects from several sites, ostraca and documents showing a tribute/tax system, and evidence from the fortress of Mezad Hashavyahu. Egyptian influence reached to the Euphrates area in places such as Kimuhu and Quramati. Later they were pushed back by the defeat at Carcemish, although Egyptian intervention in the Near East seems to have continued after this battle.

Amasis II followed a new policy and directed his interests toward the Greek world. He annexed Cyprus during his reign. to the south, Psamtik II led a great military expedition that reached deep into upper Nubia and inflicted a heavy defeat on them. A demotic papyrus from the reign of Ahmose II describes a small expedition into Nubia, the character of which is unclear. There is archaeological evidence of an Egyptian garrison at Dorginarti in lower Nubia during the Saite period.

One major contribution from the Late Period of ancient Egypt was the Brooklyn Papyrus. This was a medical papyrus with a collection of medical and magical remedies for victims of snakebites based on snake type or symptoms.

Artwork during this time was representative of animal cults and animal mummies. This image shows the god Pataikos wearing a scarab beetle on his head, supporting two human-headed birds on his shoulders, holding a snake in each hand, and standing atop crocodiles.

27th Dynasty

The First Achaemenid Period (525–404 BC) began with the Battle of Pelusium, which saw Egypt ( Mudrāya) conquered by the expansive Achaemenid Empire under Cambyses, and Egypt become a satrapy. The Twenty-seventh Dynasty of Egypt consists of the Persian emperors - including Cambyses, Xerxes I, and Darius the Great - who ruled Egypt as Pharaohs and governed through their satraps, as well as the Egyptian Petubastis III (522–520 BC) (and possibly the disputed Psammetichus IV), who rebelled in defiance of the Persian authorities. The unsuccessful revolt of Inaros II (460-454), aided by the Athenians as part of the Wars of the Delian League, aspired to the same object. The Persian satraps were Aryandes (525–522 BC; 518–c.496 BC) - whose rule was interrupted by the rebel Pharaoah Petubastis III, Pherendates (c.496–c.486 BC), Achaemenes (c.486–459 BC) - a brother of the emperor Xerxes I, and Arsames (c.454–c.406 BC).

28th–30th Dynasties

The Twenty-Eighth Dynasty consisted of a single king, Amyrtaeus, prince of Sais, who successfully rebelled against the Persians, inaugurating Egypt's last significant phase of independence under native sovereigns. He left no monuments with his name. This dynasty reigned for six years, from 404 BC–398 BC.

The Twenty-Ninth Dynasty ruled from Mendes, for the period from 398 to 380 BC. King Hakor of this dynasty was able to defeat a Persian invasion during his reign.

The Thirtieth Dynasty took their art style from the Twenty-Sixth Dynasty. A series of three pharaohs ruled from 380 to 343 BC. The first king of the dynasty, Nectanebo I, defeated a Persian invasion in 373 BC. His successor Teos subsequently led an expedition against the Achaemenid Empire in the Near East. The expedition was beginning to meet with some success and made its way to Phoenicia without particular problems. unfortunately for Teos, his brother Tjahapimu was plotting against him. Tjahapimu convinced his son Nectanebo II to rebel against Teos and to make himself pharaoh. The plan was successful and the betrayed Teos had no alternative but to flee and the expedition disintegrated. The final ruler of this dynasty, and the final native ruler of Egypt, was Nectanebo II who was defeated in battle leading to the re-annexation by the Achaemenid Empire.

31st Dynasty

The Second Achaemenid Period saw the re-inclusion of Egypt as a satrapy of the Persian Empire under the rule of the Thirty-First Dynasty, (343–332 BC) which consisted of three Persian emperors who ruled as Pharaoh—Artaxerxes III (343–338 BC), Artaxerxes IV (338–336 BC), and Darius III (336–332 BC)—interrupted by the revolt of the non-Achaemenid Khababash (338–335 BC). Persian rule in Egypt ended with the defeat of the Achaemenid Empire by Alexander the Great, who accepted the surrender of the Persian satrap of Egypt Mazaces in 332 BC, marking the beginning of Hellenistic rule in Egypt which stabilized after Alexander's death into the Ptolemaic Kingdom.

References

Bibliography 

 
Roberto B. Gozzoli: The Writing of History in Ancient Egypt During the First Millennium BCE (ca. 1070–180 BCE). Trend and Perspectives, London 2006, 
Lloyd, Alan B. 2000. "The Oxford History of Ancient Egypt, edited by Ian Shaw". Oxford and New York: Oxford University Press. 369–394
Quirke, Stephen. 1996 "Who were the Pharaohs?", New York: Dover Publications. 71–74

Primary sources
 Herodotus (Histories)
 Fragments of Ctesias (Persica)
 Thucydides (History of the Peloponnesian War)
 Diodorus Siculus (Bibliotheca historica)
 Fragments of Manetho (Aegyptiaca)

 
States and territories established in the 7th century BC
States and territories disestablished in the 4th century BC
1st millennium BC in Egypt